Athletics is an event at the Island Games, the biennial multi-sports event for island nations, territories and dependencies.

Athletics at the Island Games has been a part of the games since the beginning in 1985. The events are for both men and women.

There are limits on the number of teams and competitors that can enter from each Island. The minimum age is 15, except for the half marathon which is 18.

Island Games Records are indicated with IGR and the time or distance

Events
As of 2019.

Top Medalists

Men's Track - Sprint

Top Medalists

Results

Men's Track - Middle

Top Medalists

Results

Men's Track - Relay

Top Medalists

Results

Men's Track - Hurdles

Top Medalists

Results

Men's Track - Long

Top Medalists

Results

Men's Field - Throw

Top Medalists

Results

Men's Field - Jump

Top Medalists

Results

Women's Track - Sprint

Top Medalists

Results

Women's Track - Middle

Top Medalists

Results

Women's Track - Relay

Top Medalists

Results

Women's Track - Hurdles

Top Medalists

Results

Women's Track - Long

Top Medalists

Results

Women's Field - Throw

Top Medalists

Results

Women's Field - Jump

Top Medalists

Results

References 

iiga.org - Athletics (Links to Athletics at the Island Games since 1985)

 
Sports at the Island Games
Island Games